Marimatha is a genus of moths of the family Noctuidae. The genus was erected by Francis Walker in 1866.

Selected species
Marimatha aurifera (Walker, [1858]) southern US to Brazil, Antilles
Marimatha auruda (Schaus, 1898) Brazil (São Paulo)
Marimatha furcata (Walker, [1858]) Brazil
Marimatha intensifica (Dyar, 1914) Panama
Marimatha nigrofimbria (Guenée, 1852) southern and eastern US
Marimatha obliquata (Herrich-Schäffer, 1868) Cuba
Marimatha piscimala Ferris & Lafontaine, 2010 Texas, Arizona, Mexico, Panama, Costa Rica
Marimatha quadrata Ferris & Lafontaine, 2010 Texas, Arizona, Mexico
Marimatha rufescens (Hampson, 1910) Brazil (Bahia)
Marimatha squala Ferris & Lafontaine, 2010 Arizona to Costa Rica
Marimatha tripuncta (Möschler, 1890) Puerto Rico, southern Florida, Cuba, Dominican Republic, Haiti, Saint Croix, Virgin Islands, Trinidad

References

Acontiinae